McKay 'Macca' Springer (born 29 March 2003) is a New Zealand rugby union player who plays for  in the Bunnings NPC and the  in Super Rugby. His position is fullback.

Career 
In 2021 Springer was named as part of the  under 20 side for the Super Rugby Aotearoa Under 20 competition. He was named in the Tasman Mako squad as a development player for the 2021 Bunnings NPC. Springer made his debut for the Mako in Round 4 of the competition, coming off the bench against  at Trafalgar Park.

References

External links

New Zealand rugby union players
Living people
People educated at Waimea College
Tasman rugby union players
Rugby union fullbacks
Rugby union wings
Crusaders (rugby union) players